The Neil Armstrong Operations and Checkout Building (O&C) (previously known as the Manned Spacecraft Operations Building) is a historic building on Merritt Island, Florida, United States. The five-story structure is in the Industrial Area of NASA's Kennedy Space Center. Its has twin-block facilities that include the crew quarter dormitories for astronauts, suit-up preparations prior to their flights, and the other is a large spacecraft workshop used for manufacturing and checking activities on crewed spacecraft. On January 21, 2000, it was added to the U.S. National Register of Historic Places.

Apollo program
When it was originally built in 1964 to process spacecraft in the Gemini and Apollo era, it was known as the Manned Spacecraft Operations Building. It was renamed the Operations and Checkout Building during the Shuttle program, known informally as the O&C.

Altitude test chambers

These were used by the prime and backup crews of all crewed missions, from the ill-fated Apollo 1 in October 1966, through to the Apollo-Soyuz Test Project in July 1975.

Post-Apollo use
During the 1980s and 90s the O&C building was used to house and test Spacelab science modules before their flights aboard the Space Shuttle.

In the late 1990s and 2000s, some modules and trusses for the International Space Station were checked out in the building.

On January 30, 2007, NASA held a ceremony to mark the transition of the building's high bay for use by the Constellation program. The building would serve as the final assembly facility for the Orion crew exploration vehicle. Renovations totaling $55 million took place from June 2007 through January 2009, at which point Lockheed Martin became the operator of the facility for Orion production. The Orion spacecraft for Artemis 1 completed its assembly in this location and was moved to the Multi-Payload Processing Facility on January 16, 2021. The Crew Module of the Orion spacecraft for Artemis 2 is under assembly in the building's high bay as of August 28, 2021.

The building was renamed to the Neil Armstrong Operations and Checkout Building in a ceremony on the 45th anniversary of Apollo 11 (2014).

Gallery

Notes

External links

Operations and Checkout Building  at NASA.gov
Brevard County listings at the National Register of Historic Places
KSC building reborn as 'Spacecraft Factory of the Future' Florida Today

Kennedy Space Center
Buildings and structures in Merritt Island, Florida
Manufacturing plants
Manufacturing buildings and structures
Manufacturing plants in the United States
National Register of Historic Places in Brevard County, Florida
Historic American Engineering Record in Florida
1964 establishments in Florida
Neil Armstrong